Aborichthys is a genus of stone loaches found in streams of India with one species also found in Myanmar.

Species
There are currently 9 recognized species in this genus:
 Aborichthys boutanensis (McClelland, 1842) 
 Aborichthys cataracta Arunachalam, Raja, Malaiammal & Mayden, 2014 
 Aborichthys elongatus Hora, 1921
 Aborichthys garoensis Hora, 1925
 Aborichthys iphipaniensis Kosygin, Gurumayum, P. Singh & Chowdhury, 2019 
 Aborichthys rosammai N. Sen, 2009
 Aborichthys tikaderi Barman, 1985
 Aborichthys uniobarensis Prasanta Nanda, Krima Queen Machahary, Lakpa Tamang, & Debangshu Narayan Das, 2021
 Aborichthys verticauda Arunachalam, Raja, Malaiammal & Mayden, 2014 
 Aborichthys waikhomi Kosygin, 2012

References

Nemacheilidae